Kilcock is a town and townland in the north of County Kildare, Ireland, on the border with County Meath. Its population of 6,093 makes it the ninth largest town in Kildare and 76th largest in Ireland. The town is located 35 km (22 mi) west of Dublin, and is on the Royal Canal.

Local industries include a large Musgrave Group distribution centre, which supplies SuperValu and Centra stores across much of the country.

History
Kilcock takes its name from the 6th century Saint Coca who founded a church beside the Rye River, a major tributary of the River Liffey.  The saint is traditionally said to have been a sister of St. Kevin of Glendalough; by occupation, she was an embroiderer of church vestments, including those for St. Colmcille. A holy well dedicated to Coca, formerly thought to be lost in the back-yards of Kilcock, is believed locally to be in the area behind the Ulster Bank, and her feast is remembered on 6 June. However, this commemoration is a modern revival as when the Ordnance Survey of the area was being made in 1837 it was recorded that "there is no old church in ruins in this parish nor is any patron saint or day remembered... the meaning of the name Cille Choc is not remembered." When the present parish church was dedicated in 1867 it was named for St. Coca, and it had cost £10,000 to build to the design of architect J.J. McCarthy.

In the 8th century, there was a battle between rival kings near the church of St. Coca, then in the territory of Carbury and close to the border between Leinster and Meath. There is a gap of several hundred years until the next reference to Kilcock when, in 1303, it belonged to the Hospital of St. John of Jerusalem at Kilmainham.

In the 17th century, markets and fairs were held regularly in Kilcock. The tolls and duties of Kilcock Fairs were shared between the Wogans of Rathcoffey and the Eustaces of Castlemartin, Kilcullen, County Kildare. Kilcock had 70 acres (28 ha) of common land to which several inhabitants had a common right. There was also a Commons at Courtown (Bawnogue & Duncreevan) and Laragh Commons.

The markets in Kilcock were probably the largest in North Kildare. A measure of oats in those times was referred to as a "Kilcock Measure."

Transport 
The M4 motorway opened in 1994 and bypasses Kilcock to the south of the town. The motorway connects Dublin to the west of the country. There is an NRA plan to create an outer orbital motorway, which would extend 80 km from Naas to Drogheda, via Kilcock.

Bus Éireann has route 115 and 115A (Summerhill) running from Dublin to Mullingar passing through Kilcock.

The railway arrived in Kilcock on 28 June 1847, but the station closed on 1 July 1848, as it was sited on a 1% (1 in 100) gradient which the locomotives of the day found difficult to start off from. This site was slightly east of the current Kilcock station. A replacement station opened in 1850 west of the town, where the old N4 crosses the Royal Canal and railway, but closed in 1963. The current Kilcock railway station, under Shaw Bridge, opened in 1998.

, there is construction underway by the county council to pave a pedestrian path along the riverbank giving cyclists and avid walkers a safer route to traverse into surrounding areas such as Maynooth without having to venture onto the main road.

Education
Kilcock at present has three primary schools: Scoil Chóca Naofa, St. Joseph's BNS (which since September 2016 changed from single-sex schools to mixed schools and both schools are linked with each other), and Gaelscoil Uí Riada (an all-Irish school). The latter is located beside the Bánóg on the outskirts of the village.

Kilcock is also home to the secondary school Scoil Dara. Located on Church Street, it accommodates over 900 students from Kilcock and surrounding areas including Donadea, Summerhill, Enfield, Moynalvey and Mulhussey.

Places of interest
The town's library features mementos of the poet Teresa Brayton who was born in Kilbrook. The Old Bog Road, 4.5 km west of the town, was the subject of her most successful verse. It was set to music by Madeline King O'Farrelly and recorded by Eileen Donaghy, Josef Locke, Johnny McEvoy, Hank Locklin, Finbar Furey, Anthony Kearns, Daniel O'Donnell, Finbar Wright and many other artists up to the present day.

There is also the old manor where Lady Catherine McCormack was born in the 1800s.

Also found locally in Calgath, Co Meath is "Bridestream" (an 18th-century house which is the headquarters to a local business), and "Larchill, an 18th-century Ferme Ornée (Ornamental Farm) which is the only surviving complete garden of its type in Europe". Larchill was restored from the mid-1990s, and scenic walks through beech avenues link several classical and gothic follies. There is also a  lake with two island follies, a formal walled garden with shell-lined tower and a model gothic farmyard.

Kilcock Art Gallery was established in 1978 by Breda Smyth and opened by George Campbell, RHA.

Kilcock has a greenway cycle/walkway which runs from Maynooth through Kilcock for 38 km towards the Westmeath border.

Community
Kilcock Musical & Dramatic Society (KMDS) is an amateur musical society affiliated to the Association of Irish Musical Societies (AIMS), in existence since 1970. The society has produced a number of productions, both musical and non-musical since 1983. They include an award-winning version of Sweeney Todd and pantomime productions of Treasure Island, Aladdin, Sleeping Beauty and others. Plays performed include Juno and the Paycock, The Memory of Water, The Plough and the Stars, Dancing at Lughnasa, and The Beauty Queen of Leenane. The society presented the musical Oklahoma! in 2012.

Sport

GAA
Kilcock GAA Club is situated in the townland of Branganstown and was founded on 1 May 1887. A clubhouse was opened in 2002, consisting of a bar, sports hall and changing rooms. The town has won the Kildare Senior Football Championship five times. The club has had notable players such as Larry McCormack, Davy Dalton Jr., Davy Dalton Sr., Fred Gibbons, and Paddy Gibbons. The club caters to over 60 teams.

Football
As of 2022, there is one football club currently situated in the town, Kilcock Celtic.

Canoeing and canoe polo 
Kilcock's proximity to the Royal Canal makes it a prominent spot for canoeing. Kilcock Canoe Polo Club (KCPC) was founded in 1998, and occupies a site in the harbour at Kilcock on the Royal Canal with regular training sessions for boys and girls for canoe polo. The European Canoe Polo Championship was held there in 2003 and the Irish Open in 2013.

Basketball 
Kilcock Tigers Basketball Club was established in 2000 and is based in Scoil Dara. The club has under 11 and under 18 teams for boys and girls. Annual summer camps are run for primary school children. Kilcock Tigers is based in the Dublin Leagues and is a member of the Dublin Ladies Basketball Board and the Dublin Men's Basketball Board.

Athletics 
St. Coca's Athletic Club in Kilcock was established in the 70s and caters to athletes in the north of Kildare and the west of Meath. A number of club members have competed nationally and internationally. Training takes place at a running track in the Bawnogue.

Rugby, hockey and cricket
North Kildare RFC, which is a part of North Kildare Club, is located in the Maws, Kilcock, and was founded in 1928.

Business
Kilcock Business Association has in excess of 50 members. A committee works on behalf of the businesses in the area to promote Kilcock as the place to shop locally and encourage people to employ local tradespeople.

The town has a Lidl store which opened in February 2013, and also a SuperValu store which opened in June 2016.

Notable people
John Kenny, president of the Clan-na-Gael in New York, who ran a mission to Germany in September 1914 to request guns and military assistance from the German government, and delivered funds from America to Irish Volunteers HQ in Dublin
Ciarán Kilduff, a League of Ireland footballer
Brian Murray, a Donegal footballer who won an All-Ireland SFC medal in 1992. Currently lives in Kilcock
Pádraig Nolan, a Kildare footballer and manager
Mick O'Brien, an Irish international footballer who was capped 14 times between the years 1921 and 1927
Derek Warfield, a former member of the Wolfe Tones, lives in Kilcock

See also
 List of towns and villages in Ireland

References

External links

 
Towns and villages in County Kildare